Luke Norris (born 1 September 1985)  is an English actor best known for playing Dr Dwight Enys in Poldark.

Filmography

Film

Television

Theatre

References

External links
 

1985 births
21st-century English male actors
People from Romford
Living people